Faiwol is one of the Ok languages of Papua New Guinea.  It is spoken at the headwaters of the Fly, Palmer, and Murray rivers in Western Province. There are numerous dialects, including Faiwol proper, Angkiyak, Wopkei, Setaman, Selbang, Dimtikin, and Kauwol on the Indonesian border.

References

Languages of Sandaun Province
Languages of Western Province (Papua New Guinea)
Ok languages